San Maurizio is the Italian form of Saint Maurice, the Nubian leader of the legendary Roman Theban Legion. He has lent his name to a number of buildings and places in Italy.

Buildings
San Maurizio (Mocrone), a small church in Mocrone, near Villafranca in Lunigiana in the Province of Massa-Carrara 
San Maurizio al Monastero Maggiore, a church in Milan
San Maurizio (Mantua), a church in Mantua
San Maurizio (Monza), a church in Monza
San Maurizio, Venice, a church in Venice

Places
St.Moritz/San Maurizio, a town in Switzerland
San Maurizio Canavese, a commune of the Province of Turin
San Maurizio d'Opaglio, a commune of the Province of Novara
San Maurizio (Reggio Emilia) a quarter of Reggio Emilia
San Maurizio al Lambro, a frazione of Cologno Monzese, Province of Milan
San Maurizio (Conzano), a frazione of Conzano in the Province of Alessandria